Ahmed Basil Fadhil (born 19 August 1996) is an Iraqi professional footballer who plays as a goalkeeper for Iraqi Premier League club Al-Shorta and the Iraq national team.

Club career

Early years
Basil started his career at Al-Taji where his team earned promotion to the Iraqi Premier League. He moved to Al-Karkh and also earned promotion there, before spending a season at Al-Oloom wal-Technologia.

Al-Shorta
In July 2014, Basil signed for Al-Shorta. Basil made one appearance in the club's 2018–19 Iraqi Premier League title-winning campaign, before making 35 appearances and keeping 22 clean sheets in their 2021–22 Iraqi Premier League title-winning season. He then captained Al-Shorta to the 2022 Iraqi Super Cup title.

Basil also played eleven matches for Al-Shorta in the AFC Champions League across the 2020 and 2021 editions, as well as playing one match at the 2019–20 Arab Club Champions Cup.

International career

Youth
Basil played his first game with the Iraq U-23s in the 2018 AFC U-23 Championship qualifiers. He helped Iraq qualify for the tournament and was named in the final squad.

Senior
Basil was called up to the Iraqi national team for the first time in September 2020. Basil made his debut against Kuwait on 30 December 2022.

Honours

Club
Al-Karkh
Iraq Division One: 2012–13
Al-Shorta
Iraqi Premier League: 2018–19, 2021–22
Iraqi Super Cup: 2019, 2022

International
Iraq
 Arabian Gulf Cup: 2023

References

External links 
 

1996 births
Living people
Iraqi footballers
Iraq international footballers
Al-Karkh SC players
Al-Shorta SC players
Association football goalkeepers
Sportspeople from Baghdad